Alexandrovka is a rural locality (a settlement) in Novoromanovsky Selsoviet, Kalmansky District, Altai Krai, Russia. The population was 159 as of 2013. There are 2 streets.

Geography 
Alexandrovka is located 20 km northwest of Kalmanka (the district's administrative centre) by road. Novoromanovo is the nearest rural locality.

References 

Rural localities in Kalmansky District